The Ier or Eriu is a right tributary of the river Barcău (Berettyó) in Romania and Hungary. It discharges into the Barcău in Pocsaj. The Andrid Dam is constructed on this river. The Ier flows through the villages Mihăieni, Eriu-Sâncrai, Ghirolt, Rădulești, Hotoan, Sudurău, Dindești, Andrid, Sălacea, Cherechiu, Săcueni, Diosig in Romania, and Pocsaj in Hungary.

Hydronymy 
The Hungarian name of the river means "brook". The Romanian name derives from that.

Tributaries

The following rivers are tributaries to the river Ier:

Left: Checheț, Santău, Sărvăzel, Pir
Right: Cubic, Sânmiclăuș, Pârâul Morii, Zimoiaș, Rât, Salcia, Ierul Îngust

References

 Memoriu privind planul de apărare împotriva inundațiilor Satu Mare 

Rivers of Romania
Rivers of Bihor County
Rivers of Satu Mare County
Rivers of Hungary
International rivers of Europe